Monsignor Jean-Yves Riocreux (born 24 February 1946 at Marlhes) is the French Roman Catholic Bishop of Basse-Terre.

Mgr Riocreux was appointed Bishop of Pontoise on 5 May 2003 and consecrated on 29 June 2003. He was appointed Bishop of Basse-Terre on 15 June 2012, leaving Pontoise on 16 September, and was installed on 30 September 2012.

See also
 Catholic Church in France
 List of the Roman Catholic dioceses of France

References

Sources
 Catholic Hierarchy: Jean-Yves Riocreux

1946 births
Living people
Bishops of Pontoise
Roman Catholic bishops of Basse-Terre
People from Loire (department)
21st-century Roman Catholic bishops in France